Helga Franck (1933–February 1963) was a German stage and film actress.

Having appeared in a number of 1950s film productions, including the 1957 heimatfilm Marriages Forbidden, her career was cut short when she accidentally fell to her death from a window.

Selected filmography
 On the Reeperbahn at Half Past Midnight (1954)
 Two Bavarians in the Harem (1957)
 Marriages Forbidden (1957)
 Horrors of Spider Island (1960)

References

Bibliography
 Torsten Körner. Der kleine Mann als Star: Heinz Rühmann und seine Filme der 50er Jahre. Campus Verlag, 2001.

External links

1933 births
1963 deaths
German film actresses
Actors from Lübeck